Pseudotricula is a genus of minute freshwater snails with an operculum, aquatic gastropod molluscs or micromolluscs in the family Tateidae.

Species
 Pseudotricula arthurclarkei Ponder, S. A. Clark, Eberhard & Studdert, 2005
 Pseudotricula auriforma Ponder, S. A. Clark, Eberhard & Studdert, 2005
 Pseudotricula conica Ponder, S. A. Clark, Eberhard & Studdert, 2005
 Pseudotricula eberhardi Ponder, 1992
 Pseudotricula elongata Ponder, S. A. Clark, Eberhard & Studdert, 2005
 Pseudotricula expandolabra Ponder, S. A. Clark, Eberhard & Studdert, 2005
 Pseudotricula progenitor Ponder, S. A. Clark, Eberhard & Studdert, 2005

References

 Bank, R. A. (2017). Classification of the Recent freshwater/brackish Gastropoda of the World. Last update: January 24, 2018. OpenAccess

External links

 Ponder, W. F. (1992). A new genus and species of aquatic cave-living snail from Tasmania (Mollusca: Gastropoda: Hydrobiidae. Proceedings of the Royal Society of Tasmania. 126: 23-28

Tateidae